Confidences is a 2010 French language album by Canadian singer Roch Voisine. It includes the single, "Décembre". It was released in Canada on September 4, 2012 with re-ordered track list, some song substitutions, and alternate versions of "D'Amérique" (new musical arrangements and lyrics adapted for Canadians) and "Libre" (new musical arrangements).

A Special Edition was also released in Canada on the same day, restoring 2 of the dropped tracks from the European edition ("Ma blonde" and "Danser sous la lune") and adding a radio version of "Le Chemin" (previously released on the European "Best Of" album) and the new track "Chuis pas un rocker".

Track listing

Chart performance

External links
Roch Voisine Official site

2010 albums
Roch Voisine albums